J-ok'el is a 2007 Mexican supernatural horror film directed by Benjamin Williams. This film was Williams' debut.

Plot 
An American man travels to a small town in Chiapas, Mexico called San Cristobal de las Casas, to help his mother when he knows that his stepsister has been abducted. Everything indicates that it is a wave of kidnappings attributed to the legendary J-ok'el (Weeping Woman). This woman had drowned her children a long time ago and her spirit has returned to take other children and thus forget her own suffering.

Awards 
The film won gold medal for best music in the Park City Film Festival in Park City, Utah.

Trivia 
J-ok'el means "weeping woman" in Tzotzil language.

The budget was $500,000 USD.

Soundtrack listing
Music written and conducted by George Shaw
 "The Legend of La Llorona" - 2:21
 "Journey to Mexico" - 2:32
 "Carolina Apparition" - 0:48
 "Nocturnal Abduction" - 1:16
 "Missing Child" - 0:46
 "The Weeping Woman" - 1:48
 "Prayers for the Missing" - 3:24
 "Scaredy Dog" - 0:16
 "Market Chase" - 3:25
 "Siblings Snatched" - 1:30
 "He Left Me" - 1:42
 "Kids in the Dark" - 1:06
 "Flashlight Clue" - 0:57
 "Now You Will See" - 0:43
 "Mistaken Identity" - 1:57
 "Fernando Taken" - 1:28
 "It's J-ok'el" - 1:42
 "The Search" - 4:03
 "Cavern Confrontation" - 4:28
 "Cemetery" - 3:19
 "J-ok'el" - 2:57

References

External links 
 

2007 films
2007 horror films
Films based on folklore
Folk horror films
2000s horror thriller films
Mexican horror thriller films
2000s Spanish-language films
La Llorona
2000s Mexican films